Katherine Burns Mabry (1886–1958) was one of New Mexico’s first female lawyers.

Mabry was born on August 10, 1886 in Kansas to Enoch M. Burns and Sarah Emily Powell. She was the second wife of State Senator Thomas J. Mabry, and received her law degree from Columbia University in New York.  In 1917, she became the first female admitted to practice law in New Mexico. She thereafter practiced law in the office of her husband, who was also an attorney. She died on September 9, 1958 in New Mexico.

See also 

 List of first women lawyers and judges in New Mexico

References 

New Mexico lawyers
20th-century American women lawyers
1886 births
1958 deaths
20th-century American lawyers